Albania Plantation is a plantation house located on the Bayou Teche right outside of the town of Jeanerette, Louisiana. The home was built between 1837 and 1842 by Charles Alexandre Grevemberg, who operated a successful sugar plantation based on slave labor on the surrounding . The home is listed on the National Register of Historic Places.

In the slave schedules of the 1850 census, Grevemberg was recorded as owning 183 humans as slaves. In the 1860 slave schedules, Grevemberg's widow was listed as owning 211 humans as slaves.

After Charles Alexandre Grevemberg's death at Albania in 1851, his wife, Euphemie Fuselier (d. 1886), managed the plantation. Records of the sugar crops made in Louisiana 1859–1860 shows Mrs. Charles Grevemberg producing 475 hogsheads of sugar on the Bayou Teche.

Samuel and Isaac Delgado acquired the property in 1885. Isaac Delgado bequeathed it to the City of New Orleans which operated the sugar plantation through the Delgado-Albania Plantation Commission.

In 1957 the City of New Orleans sold the plantation house and surrounding acreage at public auction. It was acquired by Emily Cyr Bridges, who restored Albania Mansion and opened it to the public showcasing her well-known collection. Miss Emily was an enthusiastic antiquarian who traveled the countryside knocking on doors to add to her collection of Southern plantation furniture and Acadian artifacts, at a time before such objects were highly prized.

Miss Emily was the daughter of Paul N. Cyr, Lieutenant Governor of Louisiana from 1928 to 1931, under Governor Huey Long. In one of the more colorful Long-era incidents, Cyr had himself sworn in as governor in October 1931, stating that Long had vacated the office when he was elected U.S. Senator. Long called out the National Guard and the State Police to bar Cyr from the Governor's Mansion. Miss Emily shared her father's disdain for Huey Long, and banned his name from being spoken at Albania.

Never a conventional woman, Miss Emily was a pioneer aviator who flew patrol missions over the Louisiana coast as a member of the Civil Air Patrol during World War II.

In Miss Emily's heyday at Albania she loved to entertain on the galleries; her coterie included artist-in-residence Lucius Lacour. In her later years Miss Emily became reclusive, rarely receiving guests and never leaving her beloved Albania.

The home is currently owned by Hunt Slonem, the celebrated New York artist. Slonem bought the house for about $625,000 in 2005.

References

External links 
 Sweet Inspiration: : Former Sugar Plantation gets a tasteful remake

Jeanerette, Louisiana
Houses completed in 1842
Houses on the National Register of Historic Places in Louisiana
Sugar plantations in Louisiana
Houses in Iberia Parish, Louisiana
Italianate architecture in Louisiana
Plantation houses in Louisiana
National Register of Historic Places in Iberia Parish, Louisiana